Harry Endicott (June 16, 1881 – September 5, 1913) was an American racecar driver. He was the brother of fellow Indianapolis 500 participant "Farmer" Bill Endicott. He was especially good at road course racing. Endicott was killed in a dirt oval practice crash in 1913.

Biography
He was born on June 16, 1881 in Frankfort, Indiana to William M. Endicott. He was the younger brother to Bill Endicott.

Racing career
Endicott followed his brother Bill into racing in 1904. He started racing in the American Automobile Association Contest Board  Champ Car series in 1910. Endicott entered two races at the Elgin Road Race Course with a best finish of 8th place. He also withdrew from a race at the Long Island Motor Parkway. 

In 1911, Endicott qualified in third place for the 1911 Indianapolis 500 before finishing 16th. Endicott had another third place start in the Dick Ferris Trophy Race at the Santa Monica Road Race Course later that year; he crashed out after completing three laps.

In 1912, he entered and won two AAA races. After starting on the pole position, he won the Wisconsin Trophy at the Wauwatosa Road Race Course; he followed it up with winning the Jencks Trophy Race at the Elgin Road Race Course (Elgin, Illinois). At the Elgin race, he wore a leather mask which was rare at the time. 

In 1913, he started tenth at the 1913 Indianapolis 500 and finished 21st after completing only 21 (of 200) laps with transmission failure. Endicott raced twice at the Tacoma Road Race Course with fourth-place finishes both times. His last AAA race happened at Elgin where he finished fourth.

He died on September 5, 1913, in Jackson, Michigan in a motorsport practice accident and his riding mechanic, George Benedict, was injured. Endicott's tire burst which caused his car to run into a steam roller. He was buried at Holy Cross and Saint Joseph Cemetery in Indianapolis, Indiana. His brother retired from racing for several years after his death.

Indy 500 results

Images

References

External links
Harry Endicott AAA Champ Car Results at Racing Reference
 

1880s births
1913 deaths
Indianapolis 500 drivers
People from Frankfort, Indiana
Racing drivers from Indiana
Racing drivers who died while racing
Sports deaths in Michigan
Burials at Holy Cross and Saint Joseph Cemetery